Ethan Shea Horvath (born June 9, 1995) is an American professional soccer player who plays as a goalkeeper for EFL Championship club Luton Town, on loan from Nottingham Forest, and the United States national team.

Early years
Horvath was born and raised in Highlands Ranch, Colorado. His father, Peter, played college soccer with the Midwestern State Mustangs and professionally with Major Indoor Soccer League club Denver Avalanche, and his mother, Deana, played high school soccer. Horvath himself grew up playing with U.S. Soccer Development Academy side Real Colorado and for Arapahoe High School. He also trained with Bristol City, Manchester City, and Stoke City in England. He is of Hungarian ancestry on his father's side.

Club career

Molde FK
Horvath signed his first professional contract in 2013 with Tippeligaen club Molde in Norway, having been recruited by Molde manager and former Manchester United player Ole Gunnar Solskjær. Horvath first appeared in a Molde matchday squad on August 10, 2013. He made his professional debut on May 16, 2015, replacing Ørjan Nyland in the 55th minute of the match. On July 1, 2015, Nyland was sold to Bundesliga club Ingolstadt 04, leaving Horvath as Molde's starting goalkeeper at age 20. By the conclusion of the 2015 Tippeligaen, Horvath had helped Molde concede just 31 goals for the season, the second-best mark in the league only behind champions Rosenborg.

Horvath backstopped Molde to a 5–1 aggregate victory over Pyunik in the second qualifying round of the 2015–16 UEFA Champions League, before a  4–4 aggregate loss on the away goals rule to Dinamo Zagreb in the third qualifying round. Later, in the playoff round of the 2015–16 UEFA Europa League, Horvath and Molde had a 3–3 aggregate win on away goals over Standard Liège. With Molde thus qualifying for Europa League Group A, Horvath joined Brad Friedel, Kasey Keller, Tim Howard, and Brad Guzan as the only American goalkeepers ever to play in the UEFA Europa League/UEFA Cup group stage.

On October 2, 2015, Horvath was named to the Europa League Team of the Week, a day after being named Man of the Match for a 1–1 draw against Ajax in which he notched 10 saves, most notably from a point-blank header from Viktor Fischer. Horvath led Molde to a first-place finish in Europa League Group A with successful two-legged fixtures against Ajax, Celtic, and Fenerbahçe, the latter of which featured two saves on Robin van Persie and three saves on Nani. Combining his play in the Tippeligaen and in the Europa League, he had not allowed multiple goals in a match for over two months. In February 2016, Horvath faced eventual Europa League champions Sevilla in the knockout phase and was unable to prevent a 1–3 aggregate defeat of Molde, although he kept a clean sheet in the second leg.

Club Brugge
On January 3, 2017, Horvath signed with Belgium's Club Brugge on a four-and-a-half-year contract. He debuted as Club Brugge's starting goalkeeper on May 5 in the Championship playoffs. After initially letting in a goal due to confusing a whistle from the stands as the referee's whistle, Horvath rebounded to make three saves, and even notched an assist to José Izquierdo off a punt, in a 3–1 victory over Charleroi. The following match, in a 1–1 draw against Anderlecht, Horvath made four saves, including on a penalty kick attempted by Youri Tielemans. Horvath continued to start in goal to close out the season, helping Club Brugge secure a place in the 2017–18 UEFA Champions League third qualifying round.

At the start of the 2017–18 season, Horvath resumed his position as the starting goalkeeper for Club Brugge, starting in the first twelve league matches including ten victories. He also started the Champions League qualifying matches against İstanbul Başakşehir and Europa League qualifying matches against AEK Athens, both of which were defeats on aggregate. However, he was eventually benched and then kept out of the squad for much of the season, not receiving another run of starts until May 2018 in the Belgian First Division A Championship Playoffs. He started three matches in the league playoffs as Club Brugge finished as champions and thus qualified for the 2018–19 UEFA Champions League group stage.

Horvath began on the bench for Club Brugge in the 2018–19 season behind Croatian international goalkeeper Karlo Letica, but Horvath soon regained the starting job. Horvath posted a trio of consecutive clean sheets against AS Monaco, Borussia Dortmund, and Atlético Madrid in the UEFA Champions League group stage.

With Simon Mignolet joining Club Brugge ahead of the 2019–20 season, Horvath was once again relegated to the second-choice goalkeeper, being only used sparingly by the club.

Nottingham Forest
On July 13, 2021, Horvath joined EFL Championship side Nottingham Forest on a free transfer following the expiration of his contract at Club Brugge. On May 29, 2022, Horvath came on as a substitute in Forest's 1–0 play-off final victory over Huddersfield Town at Wembley Stadium in the 90th minute, due to an injury for starting goalkeeper Brice Samba.

On July 2, 2022, Horvath was loaned to Championship side Luton Town for the 2022–23 season.

International career
Horvath has represented United States youth teams at every level since U-14. He was named to the U.S. under-20 squad for the 2015 FIFA U-20 World Cup in New Zealand, although his club did not release him. He was the U.S. under-23 starting goalkeeper for the CONCACAF–CONMEBOL Olympic qualifying playoff against Colombia, conceding two goals in two matches as U.S. lost on aggregate.

Horvath was named to the 23-man U.S. squad for the Copa América Centenario held in June 2016. Head coach Jürgen Klinsmann called Horvath one of his "biggest hopes for the future" at the goalkeeper position. On October 7, 2016, Horvath made his U.S. debut, playing the full match and keeping a clean sheet in a 2–0 victory over Cuba.

On May 24, 2021, Horvath was named to the United States' roster for the 2021 CONCACAF Nations League Finals. In the 2021 CONCACAF Nations League Final on June 6, 2021, Horvath was substituted on in the second half after starting goalkeeper Zack Steffen suffered a non-contact knee injury. Horvath proved to be instrumental to the United States' 3–2 victory, as he made several key saves, including saving Andrés Guardado's penalty late into extra time which would have tied up the score and most likely sent the game to a penalty shoot-out. For his efforts, he was subsequently named the man of the match.

Personal life
Born to a Hungarian father, he also holds a Hungarian passport.

Career statistics

Club

International

Honors
Molde
Norwegian Premier League: 2014
Norwegian Football Cup: 2014

Club Brugge
Belgian Pro League: 2017–18, 2019–20, 2020–21
Belgian Super Cup: 2018
Nottingham Forest

EFL Championship play-offs: 2022

United States U20
CONCACAF Under-20 Championship bronze: 2015

United States
CONCACAF Nations League: 2019–20

References

External links

 USSF Player Profile
 UEFA Player Profile
 Club Player Profile
 Soccerbase Player Profile

1995 births
Living people
American soccer players
Molde FK players
Club Brugge KV players
Nottingham Forest F.C. players
Luton Town F.C. players
Eliteserien players
Belgian Pro League players
American expatriate soccer players
American people of Hungarian descent
Expatriate footballers in Norway
Expatriate footballers in Belgium
Expatriate footballers in England
American expatriate sportspeople in Norway
United States men's under-20 international soccer players
United States men's under-23 international soccer players
United States men's international soccer players
2015 CONCACAF U-20 Championship players
Soccer players from Colorado
Sportspeople from the Denver metropolitan area
Copa América Centenario players
2022 FIFA World Cup players
People from Highlands Ranch, Colorado
Association football goalkeepers
American expatriate sportspeople in Belgium
American expatriate sportspeople in England